The Royal Canadian Army Chaplain Corps (RCAChC) was an administrative corps of the Canadian Army. The Canadian Chaplain Service was first authorized on 1 June 1921. It was later Redesignated as The Canadian Army Chaplain Corps on 22 March 1948 and as The Royal Canadian Army Chaplain Corps on 3 June 1948.  The Royal Canadian Army Chaplain Corps was succeeded by the Chaplain Branch on May 2, 1969. The official march of the RCAChC was "Onward Christian Soldiers".

Role
Chaplains share the hardships and perils that fall to other service personnel.  "It is the business of the regimental padre to be the friend and adviser of the soldier, and the manner in which he has done this business has had more than a little to do with the maintenance of the morale of the army." John Weir Foote, chaplain of the Royal Hamilton Light Infantry, was awarded the Victoria Cross for his bravery under fire in helping care for the wounded and evacuate them from Dieppe. Ten members of the Canadian Chaplains Service are buried in World War 2 Commonwealth War Graves Commission grave plots overseas (three buried in France, two in Belgium, two in the Netherlands, two in Italy and one in the UK).

Notable Members 

 Colonel John Macpherson Almond 
 Frederick George Scott 
 Lieutenant Colonel John Weir Foote 
 Captain Walter Brown

Gallery

References
 
 Padres in No Man's Land (Canadian Chaplains and the Great War), by Duff Willis Crerar, McGill-Queen's University Press, Montreal, 1995.

Related units
This unit was allied with the following:
Royal Army Chaplains' Department

See also
Military chaplain

Corps of the Canadian Army
Military history of Canada
+Canadian Royal
Military units and formations of Canada in World War II
Military units and formations established in 1948
1948 establishments in Canada
Military units and formations disestablished in 1969
1969 disestablishments in Canada